Kozue Setoguchi (born 30 November 1991) is a Japanese professional footballer who plays as a midfielder for WE League club Chifure AS Elfen Saitama.

Club career 
Setoguchi made her WE League debut on 12 September 2021.

References 

Living people
1991 births
Japanese women's footballers
Women's association football midfielders
Association football people from Kagoshima Prefecture
Chifure AS Elfen Saitama players
WE League players